Sano Loi is one of the eight subdistricts (tambon) of Bang Bua Thong District, in Nonthaburi Province, Thailand. The subdistrict is surrounded by Bang Bua Thong and Phimon Rat subdistricts. The whole area of the subdistrict is covered by Bang Bua Thong Town Municipality. In 2020 it had a total population of 9,245 people.

References

External links
Website of Bang Bua Thong Town Municipality

Tambon of Nonthaburi province
Populated places in Nonthaburi province